Activating transcription factor 6, also known as ATF6, is a protein that, in humans, is encoded by the ATF6  gene and is involved in the unfolded protein response.

Function 

ATF6 is an endoplasmic reticulum (ER) stress-regulated transmembrane transcription factor that activates the transcription of ER molecules. Accumulation of misfolded proteins in the Endoplasmic Reticulum results in the proteolytic cleavage of ATF6.  The cytosolic portion of ATF6 will move to the nucleus and act as a transcription factor to cause the transcription of ER chaperones.

See also 
 Activating transcription factor

Interactions 
ATF6 has been shown to interact with YY1 and Serum response factor.

References

Further reading

External links 
 
 

Transcription factors